Graeme Hall may refer to:

 Graeme Hall (dog trainer) (born 1956)
 Graeme Hall (weightlifter) (1942–2015), Australian weightlifter
 Graeme Hall (rower) (born 1946), British rower

See also
 Graeme Hall Nature Sanctuary, wetland at Graeme Hall, in Christ Church, Barbados